Tianjin Development Holdings Limited or Tianjin Development is a conglomerate engaged in container terminal operations, toll roads, water supply, electric utilities, pharmaceuticals and property development in Tianjin, China. In 2005, Tianjin Development split Tianjin Port Development to be listed on the Hong Kong Stock Exchange.

On 22 July 2015, a subsidiary of Tianjin Development agreed to acquire from Tianjin Pharmaceutical Group Co., Ltd. 67% shares of the issued share capital of Thrive Leap Limited (隆騰有限公司) at a consideration of RMB 2.3 billion. Thrive Leap Limited indirectly holds approximately 51.36% of the total issued A shares in Tianjin Lisheng Pharmaceutical Co., Ltd. (天津力生製藥股份
有限公司), 65% equity interest in Tianjin Yiyao Printing Co., Ltd. (天津宜藥印務有限公司), and  100% equity interest Tianjin Institute of Pharmaceutical Research Co., Ltd. (天津藥物研究院有限公司).

External links
Tianjin Development Holdings Limited

References

Companies listed on the Hong Kong Stock Exchange
Companies established in 1997
Logistics companies of China
Government-owned companies of China
Conglomerate companies of China
Companies based in Tianjin
Conglomerate companies of Hong Kong
1997 establishments in Hong Kong